also known by his Chinese style name , was a prince of Ryukyu Kingdom.

Prince Urasoe was the second son of King Shō Boku. He was a full-brother of Crown Prince Shō Tetsu, and also a half-brother of Prince Yoshimura Chōgi and Prince Ginowan Chōshō. He was given Urasoe magiri (modern Urasoe, Okinawa) as his hereditary fief, and established a new royal family: Urasoe Udun.

Prince Urasoe served as sessei from 1794 to 1797. He was good at waka poetry.

References

|-

1762 births
1797 deaths
Princes of Ryūkyū
Sessei
People of the Ryukyu Kingdom
Ryukyuan people
18th-century Ryukyuan people